The Archdiocese of Huambo is a Latin Metropolitan archdiocese of the Roman Catholic Church in western Angola.

The cathedral see of the archbishop is the Marian Cathedral of the Conception of Our Lady, in Huambo.

By 2019, the archdiocese had approximately 1.1 million Roman Catholics and 88 diocesan priests.

History 
On 4 September 1940, the Diocese of Nova Lisboa was established on assembled territories split off from the Diocese of São Paulo de Loanda and mission sui iuris of Cunene, mainly to serve the growing European population in what was then the colony of Portuguese Angola.

As time went on, it shed territory due to the creation of other dioceses :
 on 27 July 1955 to establish the then Diocese of Sá da Bandeira (now the Archiocese of Lubango)
 on 6 June on 1970 to establish its future suffragan diocese, the Diocese of Benguela
 on 10 October 1975 to establish the Diocese of Serpa Pinto (later renamed the Diocese of Menongue) and the Diocese of Pereira de Eça (later renamed the Diocese of Ondjiva).

On 3 February 1977, the Diocese of Nova Lisboa was promoted and renamed the Metropolitan Archdiocese of Huambo.

In June 1992, it enjoyed a Papal visit from Pope John Paul II.

Geography
The archdiocese has an area of 35,770 square kilometers and comprises most of Huambo Province, including the following municipalities:
 Huambo
 Bailundo
Ekunha
Caála
Katchiungo 
Londuimbali
Longonjo
Mungo
Tchicala Tcholohanga
Ucuma

Bishops
(all Roman Rite)
† = deceased

Episcopal ordinaries
Suffragan Bishops of Nova Lisboa
 † Daniel Gomes Junqueira (C.S.Sp.) (28 January 1941 – death 29 June 1970), previously Apostolic Prefect of Cubango in Angola (Angola) (1938 – 28 January 1941)
 † Américo Henriques (19 February 1972 – 13 April 1976, died 2006); previously Titular Bishop of Tisili (3 July 1966  – 2 February 1971) & Auxiliary Bishop of Lamego (Portugal) (3 July 1966  – 15 April 1967), promoted to Coadjutor Bishop of Lamego (15 April 1967 – 2 February 1971) and succeeded as Bishop of Lamego (2 February 1971 – 19 February 1972)

Metropolitan Archbishops of Huambo
 † Manuel Franklin da Costa (3 February 1977 – 12 September 1986), also President of Episcopal Conference of Angola and São Tomé (1982 – 1990); previously Bishop of Henrique de Carvalho (Angola) (10 August 1975  – 3 February 1977); later Metropolitan Archbishop of Lubango (Angola) (12 September 1986 – retired 15 January 1997, died 2003)
 Francisco Viti 12 September 1986 – retired 31 July 2003); previously Bishop of Serpa Pinto (now Menongue; Angola) (10 August 1975  – 16 May 1979), restyled Bishop of Menongue (Angola) (16 May 1979  – 12 September 1986)
 † ''Apostolic Administrator Oscar Lino Lopes Fernandes Braga (31 July 2003 – 3 May 2004), while Bishop of suffragan see Benguela (Angola) (20 November 1974  – 18 February 2008)
 José de Queirós Alves, C.SS.R. (3 May 2004 – 1 October 2018), former Bishop of Menongue (Angola) (12 September 1986  – 3 May 2004), also stayed Apostolic Administrator of his former see Menongue (27 June 2004  – 3 August 2005)
Zeferino Zeca Martins, S.V.D. (1 October 2018 - ...), previously Auxiliary Bishop of Luanda (19 May 2012 - 1 October 2018)

Other priests of the Archdiocese who became bishops 
 † Mateus Feliciano Augusto Tomás (Bishop of the Diocese of Namibe, 21 March 2009 – 30 October 2010)

Province 
Its ecclesiastical province comprises the Metropolitan's archdiocese and the following suffragan sees:
 Roman Catholic Diocese of Benguela
 Roman Catholic Diocese of Kwito-Bié

Demographics 
The diocese has a population of approximately 2,456,000, most of whom are Ovimbundu or Ganguela. The most common spoken languages are Umbundu and Portuguese.

See also 
 List of Roman Catholic dioceses in Angola

References

Source and External links 
 GCatholic.org, with incumbent biography links

 
Huambo
Huambo Province
Huambo
Huambo
Christian organizations established in 1940
1940s establishments in Angola
Huambo